The HBCU Classic is an annual American football game played in Greenville, South Carolina at Sirrine Stadium.

History
The first HBCU Classic was held in 2005 in Greenville, South Carolina.

Game results

See also
List of black college football classics

References

Black college football classics
2005 establishments in South Carolina
Recurring sporting events established in 2005
Sports in Greenville, South Carolina